The Diploma of Biblical Studies (DipBS) is a one-year course in biblical, theological, historical and pastoral studies offered by a variety of Christian Bible Colleges.

Colleges offering a DipBS
The following colleges offer a Diploma of Biblical Studies or an equivalent:

United States
Beacon Institute of Ministry, Columbus, Georgia
Summit Theological Seminary, Peru, Indiana 
Christian Leaders Institute, Michigan 
Ames International School of Ministry, Florida 
International School of Ministry (ISOM), San Bernardino, California

Canada
Bethany College, Saskatchewan, Canada 
Kawartha Lakes Bible College, Ontario, Canada 
Emmanuel Bible College.Ontario, Canada

Australia
Moore Theological College, Sydney, Australia 
Citipointe Ministry College, Brisbane, Australia

New Zealand
Bible College of New Zealand
The Shepherd’s Bible College, New Zealand 
South Pacific Bible College, Tauranga, New Zealand

Pakistan
The Protestant Biblical Institute
Lord’s Bible College and Seminary Islamabad

References

Protestant education
Religious degrees